Dianne Carol Rosemary "Beth" Peach (born 25 December 1939) is a British figure skater. She competed in the women's singles event at the 1956 Winter Olympics.

References

1939 births
Living people
Sportspeople from Birmingham, West Midlands
Olympic figure skaters of Great Britain
Figure skaters at the 1956 Winter Olympics
British female single skaters